Kalanti (officially Uusikirkko Tl during 1915–1936) is a former municipality in Southwest Finland region, Finland. Kalanti is first mentioned in historical sources 1316. It was merged with Uusikaupunki in 1993.

In 1756, a religious revival that had a strong impact on the Southwest Finland began in Kalanti, when Lisa Eriksdotter experienced a religious epiphany.

References

Populated places disestablished in 1993
Former municipalities of Finland
Uusikaupunki